In class-based, object-oriented programming, an instance variable is a variable defined in a class (i.e., a member variable), for which each instantiated object of the class has a separate copy, or instance. An instance variable has similarities with a class variable, but is non-static. An instance variable is a variable which is declared in a class but outside of constructors, methods, or blocks. Instance variables are created when an object is instantiated, and are accessible to all the constructors, methods, or blocks in the class. Access modifiers can be given to the instance variable.

An instance variable is not a class variable, although there are similarities. It is a type of class attribute (or class property, field, or data member). The same dichotomy between instance and class members applies to methods ("member functions") as well; a class may have both instance methods and class methods.

Each instance variable lives in memory for the lifetime of the object it is owned by.

Variables are properties an object knows about itself. All instances of an object have their own copies of instance variables, even if the value is the same from one object to another. One object instance can change values of its instance variables without affecting all other instances. Instance variables can be used by all methods of a class unless the method is declared as static.

Example

struct Request {

    static int count1; // variable name is not important
    int number;

    Request() {
        number = count1; // modifies the instance variable "this->number"
        ++count1; // modifies the class variable "Request::count1"
    }

};

int Request::count1 = 0;

In this C++ example, the instance variable Request::number is a copy of the class variable Request::count1 where each instance constructed is assigned a sequential value of count1 before it is incremented. Since number is an instance variable, each Request object contains its own distinct value; in contrast, there is only one object Request::count1 available to all instances with the same value.

References

Object-oriented programming
Variable (computer science)